Moïse Houde (February 11, 1811 – July 23, 1885) was a politician in the Quebec, Canada. He served as Member of the Legislative Assembly.

Early life

He was born on February 11, 1811, in Louiseville, Mauricie, the son of Augustin Houde and Geneviève Foucher.

Before 1867

Houde ran for a seat to the Legislative Assembly of the Province of Canada in the district of Maskinongé in 1861, but was defeated by Parti bleu incumbent George Caron.

He ran again in 1863 and won.  He sat with the members of the Parti rouge.

After 1867

After the British North America Act of 1867 was enacted, Houde joined the Liberal Party.  He ran for a seat in the district of Maskinongé to both the House of Commons and the Legislative Assembly of Quebec, but was defeated on all accounts.

He ran again in 1871 and was elected to the provincial legislature.  He was re-elected as a Conservative in 1875, but was defeated in 1878.

Houde's nephew Frédéric Houde served as a member of the House of Commons from 1878 to 1884.

Death

He died on July 23, 1885.

Footnotes

1811 births
1885 deaths
Members of the Legislative Assembly of the Province of Canada from Canada East
Quebec Liberal Party MNAs
Conservative Party of Quebec MNAs